Events in the year 1985 in the Republic of India.

Incumbents
 President of India – Zail Singh
 Prime Minister of India – Rajiv Gandhi
 Chief Justice of India – Yeshwant Vishnu Chandrachud (until 11 July), Prafullachandra Natwarlal Bhagwati

Governors
 Andhra Pradesh – Shankar Dayal Sharma (until 26 November), Kumud Ben Joshi (starting 26 November)
 Assam – Bhishma Narain Singh
 Bihar – Akhlaqur Rahman Kidwai (until 15 March), P. Venkatasubbaiah (starting 15 March)
 Gujarat – Braj Kumar Nehru
 Haryana – Saiyid Muzaffar Husain Burney  
 Himachal Pradesh – Hokishe Sema 
 Jammu and Kashmir – Jagmohan Malhotra 
 Karnataka – Ashoknath Banerji 
 Kerala – P. Ramachandran 
 Madhya Pradesh – K.M Chandy 
 Maharashtra – 
 until 16 April: Idris Hasan Latif
 19 April-30 May: Pir Muhammad
 starting 31 May: Kona Prabhakara Rao
 Manipur – K. V. Krishna Rao 
 Meghalaya – Bhishma Narain Singh 
 Nagaland – K. V. Krishna Rao 
 Odisha – Bishambhar Nath Pande 
 Punjab – 
 until 14 March: Kershasp Tehmurasp Satarawala 
 14 March-14 November: Arjun Singh
 14 November-26 November: Hokishe Sema
 starting 26 November: Shankar Dayal Sharma
 Rajasthan – Om Prakash Mehra (until 4 January), Vasantdada Patil (starting 20 November)
 Sikkim – 
 until 30 May: Kona Prabhakar Rao 
 30 May-20 November: Bhishma Narain Singh 
 starting 20 November: T.V. Rajeswar
 Tamil Nadu – Sundar Lal Khurana 
 Tripura – K. V. Krishna Rao 
 Uttar Pradesh – Chandeshwar Prasad Narayan Singh (until 31 March), Mohammed Usman Arif (starting 31 March)
 West Bengal – Uma Shankar Dikshit

Events
 National income - 2,845,341 million
 16 January - Coomar Narain an employee of SLM Maneklal Industries and certain personal staff of Principal Secretary to the Prime Minister of India were arrested in connection with leaking of classified documents to foreign agents under Official Secrets Act (India).
 10 March - India won the first World Championship of Cricket held at Australia by defeating Pakistan in the final.
 30 March - The Special Protection Group is created
 10 April – Chakravarty Committee was set up by the RBI to review the working of monetary system. Its recommendations had far reaching consequences eventually removing India from the 500-year-old silver standard
 23 June – Air India Flight 182, a Boeing 747, blows up 31,000 feet (9,500 m) above the Atlantic Ocean, south of Ireland, killing all 329 aboard.
 By mid-1985, the statutory preemption on banks' resources in the form of the Statutory Liquidity Ratio and the Cash Reserve Ratio exceeded 45%. 
 KS Oils company is founded.
 Texas Instruments, a multinational corporation, starts its India operations in Bangalore and helps create infrastructure to export software via satellite communications from India for the first time.

Law
 24 May - Terrorist and Disruptive Activities (Prevention) Act is came into effect after presidential assent. 
 2 September - Indira Gandhi National Open University is established by an Act of Indian Parliament.
 14 November - The Narcotic Drugs and Psychotropic Substances Act is passed by Parliament came into force.
 The Administrative tribunals in Delhi, Mumbai, Calcutta and Allahabad were established by Administrative Tribunals Act, 1985.

Births

16 january Sidharth malothra, actor
17 February  Sivakarthikeyan, actor, producer, lyricist, TV anchor.
22 February – Bombayla Devi Laishram, archer.
5 March  Varalaxmi Sarathkumar, actress
9 March - Parthiv Patel, cricketer
26 March – Kedar Jadhav, Cricketer.
27 March  Ram Charan, actor and producer.
6 April – Jai, actor.
23 April – Annies Kanmani Joy, IAS.
9 May – Neha Bamb, actress.
15 May – Tathagata Mukherjee, actor. 
1 June – Dinesh Karthik, cricketer.
19 June – Kajal Aggarwal, actress.
25 June – Durga Shakti Nagpal, Indian bureaucrat.
22 July  Yogi Babu, actor and comedian.
18 September  Vignesh Shivan, film director, lyricist and producer.
23 September – Ambati Rayudu, cricketer.
18 October - Sourabhee Debbarma, singer.
26 October – Asin Thottumkal, actress.
1 November – Anand Ambani, Business Magnet.
2 November – Diana Penty, actress.
11 November – Robin Uthappa, cricketer.
5 December – Shikhar Dhawan, cricketer.
21 December  Andrea Jeremiah, actress and singer.

Deaths
31 October – Hardit Malik, diplomat, civil servant and cricketer (born 1894)
6 November – Sanjeev Kumar, actor (born 1938).

See also 
 Bollywood films of 1985

References

 
India
Years of the 20th century in India
1980s in India
India